Mai Therese Shanley (born February 17, 1963) is an American model and beauty pageant titleholder who won Miss New Mexico 1983, Miss New Mexico USA 1984 and Miss USA 1984.

Biography
Her mother is ethnically Chinese and is from Taiwan, while her father is Irish and was born in Ireland.
Shanley's first pageant experience came when she represented New Mexico in the Miss America pageant in 1983. She did not place in that pageant.

Later, Shanley became the second Eurasian delegate to win Miss USA. She was 21 at the time she was crowned the 33rd winner at the pageant held in  Lakeland, Florida, on May 17, 1984.  She also edged out two former Miss America state titleholders in the top five, Kelly Anderson (Miss West Virginia 1982) and Desiree Denise Daniels (Miss Tennessee 1982), who placed second and third, respectively.

Shanley went on to compete at the Miss Universe Pageant in Miami, FL in July 1984, where she was a semi-finalist. She married pilot Mark Fitzgerald and has two daughters.

References

External links

1963 births
American people of Irish descent
American beauty pageant winners of Chinese descent
Living people
Miss America 1980s delegates
Miss Universe 1984 contestants
Miss USA winners
People from Alamogordo, New Mexico
20th-century American people
American people of Taiwanese descent